Burrell Shields (September 6, 1929 – January 15, 1997) was an American football halfback. He played for the Pittsburgh Steelers in 1954 and for the Baltimore Colts in 1955.

References

1929 births
1997 deaths
American football halfbacks
John Carroll Blue Streaks football players
Pittsburgh Steelers players
Baltimore Colts players